Subtractive synthesis is a method of sound synthesis in which partials of an audio signal (often one rich in harmonics) are attenuated by a filter to alter the timbre of the sound. While subtractive synthesis can be applied to any source audio signal, the sound most commonly associated with the technique is that of analog synthesizers of the 1960s and 1970s, in which the harmonics of simple waveforms such as sawtooth, pulse or square waves are attenuated with a voltage-controlled resonant low-pass filter. Many digital, virtual analog and software synthesizers use subtractive synthesis, sometimes in conjunction with other methods of sound synthesis.

Examples of subtractive synthesis

A human example 
The basis of subtractive synthesis can be understood by considering the human voice; when a human speaks, sings or makes other vocal noises, the vocal folds act as an oscillator and the mouth and throat as a filter. Consider the difference between singing "oooh"  and "aaah" , at the same pitch. The sound generated by the vocal folds is much the same in either case — a sound that is rich in harmonics. The difference between the two comes from the filtering applied with the mouth and throat. By changing the shape of the mouth, the frequency response of the filter is changed, removing (subtracting) some of the harmonics. The "aaah" sound has most of the original harmonics still present; the "oooh" sound has most of them removed (or, to be more precise, reduced in amplitude). By gradually changing from "oooh" to "aaah" and back again, a spectral glide is created, emulating the "sweeping filter" effect that is the basis of the "wah-wah" guitar effect.

Humans are also capable of generating something approximating white noise by making a "sshh" sound. If a person "synthesizes" a "jet plane landing" sound, this is achieved mostly by altering the shape of the mouth to filter the white noise into pink noise by removing the higher frequencies. The same technique (filtered white noise) can be used to electronically synthesize the sound of ocean waves and wind, and was used in early drum machines to create snare drum and other percussion sounds.

For example, say the word "shoe" slowly, but keep making the "sh" throughout the entire word instead of just the beginning. Also try making the "sh" sound, but with a smile expression, and then continue "sh" while changing to a puckered or kissing expression.

An electronic example 

The following is an example of subtractive synthesis as it might occur in an electronic instrument. It was created with a personal computer program designed to emulate an analogue subtractive synthesizer. This example will attempt to imitate the sound of a plucked string.

Whilst the following example illustrates how a desired sound might be achieved in practice, only the final three stages are really subtractive synthesis, and the early stages could be considered to be a form of additive synthesis.

First, two oscillators produce relatively complex and harmonic-rich waveforms:

Pulse-width modulation is added for a dynamically changing tone:

The two sounds are mixed. In this case they are combined at equal volume, but any ratio could be used.

The combined wave is passed through a voltage-controlled amplifier connected to an ADSR envelope. In other words, its volume is changed according to a pre-set pattern. This is an attempt to emulate the envelope of a plucked string:

Then pass the sound through a shallow low-pass filter:

In this case, to better emulate the sound of a plucked string, the filter cutoff frequency should start in the mid-range and to low. The effect is similar to an electric guitar's wah pedal.

In real music production, there is often an additional step. An oscillator with a very low frequency modulates one or more sounds over time, creating a dynamically changing sound.

See also 
 Additive synthesis
 Minimoog
 MicroKorg
 Modular synthesizer
 Korg MS-20
 Novachord
 Steiner-Parker Synthacon

References

External links
AMS – A free software synthesis program for ALSA.

Sound synthesis types

ru:Субтрактивный синтез